The section of the Great Dividing Range between the Ramshead Range and Dicky Cooper Bogong in the Snowy Mountains is known as the Main Range. It can also be used more generally for the peaks (not necessarily on the Great Dividing Range) on or on short spurs off the range. It contains many of the highest peaks in mainland Australia. Some peaks on the Main Range include (from the south):

The Ramsheads
Mount Kosciuszko
Muellers Peak
Mount Townsend, Mount Alice Rawson and Abbotts Peak (on Abbotts Ridge)
Mount Northcote, Mount Clark and Mount Lee
Carruthers Peak
Mount Twynam and Little Twynam
Mount Anton and Mount Anderson
Mount Tate
Dicky Cooper Bogong

See also
 Australian Alps

References

 Geehi Bushwalking Club, (2001) 8th ed. Snowy Mountains Walks, Canberra: National Capital Printing. 

Snowy Mountains
Great Dividing Range